Ponto Lake is a  lake located  north and  east of Backus, Minnesota.

A public access is located on the southeast shore just north of State Highway 84. The Minnesota Department of Natural Resources (MNDNR) has classified Minnesota's lakes into 43 different classes based on physical, chemical and other characteristics. Ponto Lake is in Lake Class 23; lakes in this class generally have hard water, are very deep and clear, and have a low amount of lake area less than 15 feet deep. This lake is managed primarily for walleye and northern pike and secondarily for bluegill, black crappie, largemouth bass, and yellow perch.

Ponto Lake has an abundant population of naturally reproducing walleye. Bluegill, black crappie and yellow perch are available for anglers, however numbers sampled in the 2002 assessment were low.

References
Minnesota DNR Lake Information

Lakes of Minnesota
Lakes of Cass County, Minnesota